Yixiu District is a district of the city of Anqing, Anhui Province, People's Republic of China.

Administrative divisions
Yixiu District has jurisdiction over one subdistrict, three towns and 2 townships. As of 2019, the county was subdivided in 18 towns and 3 townships.

Subdistricts
Daqiao Subdistrict
Towns 
Dalongshan, Luoling, Yangqiao
Townships
Wuheng Township, Baizehu Township
Others
Daqiaojing Economic Development Zone

References

County-level divisions of Anhui
Anqing